Jack Cade's Cavern is a cavern, extending several hundred feet underground, in Blackheath, south-east London, England. It is located northwest of the Heath and southwest of Greenwich Park, mostly beneath the lawn of Hollymount Close.  It was re-discovered in about the year 1780. They are also referred to as the Blackheath Caverns. The entrance was at the end of a row of small cottages called "Cavern Cottages" at the rear of Trinity Church on Blackheath Hill, (destroyed in WWII).

Dimensions 
Entered by a flight of forty steps, it consisted of three or more separate caverns joined to one another by tunnels.

Further reading
 History of Lee and its Neighbourhood by F. H. Hart pp. 90–91 Perhaps this has best description of the cavern.
 Kentish Mercury Almanac, 1903
 The Ambulator, 11th edition, p. 49
 Underground passages, caverns, etc. of Greenwich and Blackheath, a lecture by J. M. Stone to the Greenwich Antiquarian Society, 26 February 1914

Notes and references

External links
www.shadyoldlady.com The location of the last known entrance to Jack Cade's Caverns.
Greenwich Industrial History Society Mr Budd & The Temple of Doom by Tony Lord
Printed 1810 copy of original survey made in 1695, drawn by Samuel Travers

Buildings and structures in the Royal Borough of Greenwich
Caves of London
Geography of the Royal Borough of Greenwich
Air raid shelters in the United Kingdom
Blackheath, London